The 1977 SMU Mustangs football team represented Southern Methodist University (SMU) as a member of the Southwest Conference (SWC) during the 1977 NCAA Division I football season. Led by second-year head coach Ron Meyer, the Mustangs compiled an overall record of 4–7 with a mark of 3–5 in conference play, tying for sixth place in the SWC.

Schedule

Roster

Team players in the NFL

References

SMU
SMU Mustangs football seasons
SMU Mustangs football